Antoine Léger (– November 30, 1824) was a French cannibal and murderer, convicted for the rape and killing of Aimée Constance Debully, whom he later partially devoured. For this crime, he was later guillotined.

Biography

Childhood and adolescence 
Antoine Léger testified that, from an early age, he avoided socializing with his peers due to his tendency to prefer to be alone.

From the age of 15, he was a barn drummer and played the bassoon in the woods; in 1815, he served in the Soissons garrison.

Escape 
In 1824, on St. John's Day, he left his parents' house to become a hermit, after having made them believe that he was going to work as a domestic servant in Dourdan.

Having given free rein to his desire for isolation, he lived, during the first fortnight, among peasants; at the end of his eight-day, he found a cave near the Charbonnière Rock, located above Moutmiraux, where he spent the rest of the time until his arrest.

Crime

Murder of Aimée Constance Debully 
On August 10, 1824, Léger saw Debully walking by. He then slipped behind her, strangled her with his handkerchief, then carried the corpse into the middle of the woods and committed acts of necrophilia before devouring certain parts of Aimée, notably eating her heart. He then took the corpse to his cave, where he buried it in the sand.

The disappearance of Debully mobilized the population: the peasants searched for her and suspected all foreigners in the area; after five days, a blue and white handkerchief belonging to the victim was discovered.  Finally, on August 16, the entrance to Léger's cave was found, and the smell of decomposition of the corpse led the investigators to the makeshift grave.

Arrest 
Four days before, on August 12, a cantonal guard saw a suspicious man near a fountain, whom he tried to approach, but failed. He stood guard the next day before the fountain and in the evening, with the help of surrounding peasants, apprehended Léger.

Initially arrested for vagrancy, Antoine claimed to be without parents and an escapee from the Brest Prison, where he claimed to have served a 20-year penal labor sentence.

Trial, sentence and execution 
His trial took place on November 23, 1824, at the Versailles cour d'assises. The court ordered, due to the gruesome nature of the crime, that the trial be held in private, despite the wishes of the crowd that had gathered to attend.  After initially denying responsibility, Léger decided to confess when questioned by the judge. His lawyer, Mon. Benoît tried to unsuccessfully plead insanity, with his client alleging that he had caught a cold that had temporarily driven him crazy.  The jury deliberated for half an hour before finding him guilty of murder, and sentenced Antoine Léger to death.

Antoine Léger was guillotined on November 30, 1824, in Versailles. Following an autopsy, doctors discovered abnormalities in his brain.

See also 
 List of incidents of cannibalism

Notes and references

Notes

References

Bibliography 
 

1790s births
1824 deaths
19th-century French criminals
19th-century French military personnel
French people convicted of murder
French rapists
French cannibals
Necrophiles
People convicted of murder by France
French murderers of children
People executed by France by guillotine
Executed French people
19th-century executions by France
Executed military personnel